Kagarko is a Local Government Area in Kaduna State of Nigeria. Its headquarters are in the town of Kagarko. It has an area of 2,356 km and a population of 239,058 at the 2006 census. The Local Government Council is chaired by Nasara Rabo. The postal code is 802.

Boundaries
Kagarko (Wogon) Local Government Area shares boundaries with Kachia Local Government Area to the north, Jaba Local Government Area to the east, Niger State to west and the FCT to the south, respectively.

People
The people are predominantly farmers. The Batinor (Koro) people is the dominant group in the area. Others are Gbagyi, Ham, Hausa and Adara. They are very hard working and mostly farmers, about 70% of ginger produced in Kaduna State is from Kagarko.

Traditional stools
Kagarko consists of three chiefdoms:

 Kagarko Chiefdom: Headed by the Sarkin Kagarko, Alh. Sa'ad Abubakar, with headquarters in Kagarko Town
 Jere Chiefdom: Headed by the Sarkin Kagarko, Dr. Sa'ad Usman (OFR) with headquarters in Jere.
 Koro Chiefdom: Headed by the Ere-Koro, Ere Yohanna Akaito (JP), with headquarters in Uhucha;

References

External links

Local Government Areas in Kaduna State